This is a list of American football players who played only one game in the National Football League (NFL) during the league's first decade from 1920 to the 1929. This list includes players from the American Professional Football Association (APFA) during the 1920 and 1921 seasons, i.e., before the APFA was renamed the NFL in 1922.  This list does not include those who were on an active roster but never actually appeared in a game. Nor does it include those who appeared only in a pre-season or exhibition game.

Key
 Date - The "Date" column is intended to provide the date of the player's appearance in an NFL game. If the exact date has not yet been verified, then the column simply lists the year.
 Start - The "Start" column is intended to state whether or not the player's appearance in an NFL game was as a "starter". If the player appeared in the game as a substitute, the entry should state "No".

1920

1921

1922

1923

1924

1925

1926

1927

1928

1929

Notes

References

One gamers